The Italian-language surname Santilli may refer to:

Antonia Santilli, Italian actress and model
Ivana Santilli, Canadian R&B singer and multi-instrumentalist
Diego Santilli, Argentine politician
Mario Santilli,  Argentine footballer 
Ray Santilli,  British musician, record, and film producer
Roberto Santilli, volleyball coach
Ruggero Santilli, Italian-American nuclear physicist known for his fringe science

Italian-language surnames